Oliver Sollitt (October 16, 1860 – August 18, 1945) was an American politician and businessman.

Sollitt was born in Chicago, Illinois. He was a businessman and was the head of the Sollitt Construction Company in Chicago. Sollitt served in the Illinois House of Representatives from 1907 to 1911 and was a Republican. Sollitt died at a hospital in Coral Gables, Florida. He had moved to Coral Gables in 1924 after retiring from the construction company.

Notes

1860 births
1945 deaths
Businesspeople from Chicago
Politicians from Chicago
People from Coral Gables, Florida
Republican Party members of the Illinois House of Representatives